Dianke  is a village and commune of the Cercle of Niafunké in the Tombouctou Region of Mali. In the 2009 census the commune had a population of 12,684.

References

External links
.

Communes of Tombouctou Region